Samuel Thomas Staughton (17 November 183829 August 1901) was an English-born pioneer of the district surrounding Melton, Victoria, Australia. He was also a long-time member of the Victorian Legislative Assembly.

Biography
Samuel Thomas Staughton MLA, second son of Simon Staughton, was born on 17 November 1838 in Hertford, England. He came to Australia with his family in around 1841. In 1863 he inherited a large share of his father's property including Eynesbury. He returned to England, aged 13 for schooling at Mill Hill Grammar School and later King's College London. He was called to the Bar at Lincoln's Inn in 1860, but did not practice.

He married Eliza Mary Ann Hopkins, daughter of John Rout Hopkins, on 23 April 1874. He had seven children. He was president of the Shire of Werribee from 1884-1885 and a member of the Braybrook District Road Board.

He was member of the Victorian Legislative Assembly for West Bourke for over 20 years.

He is buried in the Kew cemetery. His estate was valued at £116,000.

His son, also named Samuel Thomas, succeeded him as the member for West Bourke.

Notes

References

 

1838 births
1901 deaths
Members of the Victorian Legislative Assembly
19th-century Australian politicians
English emigrants to colonial Australia